Mugeary is a farm or croft and former settlement on the island of Skye, Scotland. The Gaelic name is derived from Old Norse and probably means "narrow field".

Location
The Glenmore flows into the River Snizort, which passes the settlement of Carbost and joins the sea at the head of the innermost arm of Loch Snizort Beag.

There is a track across the Bealach Mòr (English: big pass) to the north of Stròc-bheinn which leads to the forestry plantation above the main A87 road south of Portree. According to the Skye and Lochalsh Local Plan of 2007 the Glenmore valley has potential both for further afforestation and also wind power developments in the vicinity of Mugeary.

To the south the landscape is dominated by the forestry plantation of Glen Tungadal through which flows the upper reaches of the River Snizort, providing beats for salmon and trout during the fishing season.

Mugeary's elevated situation in the path of prevailing westerly winds leads to a cool and damp climate. Average annual temperatures are c.  and annual rainfall exceeds .

History
The ruins surrounding the extant croft suggest a more substantial settlement prior to the Clearances, which devastated many parts of Skye, and a well-documented case from the 1850s in the parish of Snizort exists.

The RCAHMS have identified an old field system northwest of the existing farm buildings that predates 1881 and a second record describes the area as a crofting "township".

Mugearite
Mugearite is a type of oligoclase-bearing basalt, comprising olivine, apatite, and opaque oxides. The main feldspar in mugearite is oligoclase. It was first identified by Alfred Harker in 1904 from formations in the vicinity of Mugeary, making this remote spot the rock's "type locality". It occurs in a variety of locations worldwide, including outcrops near Dunedin in New Zealand and in the Hawaiian Islands.

In 2012 the Mars exploration vehicle Curiosity discovered a small rock, named "Jake Matijevic" by NASA scientists, which appears to be made of mugearite. Coincidentally, the village of Glenelg lies on the west coast of mainland Scotland, just  from Mugeary itself.

Notes

References
 
  I. D. Muir and C. E. Tilley (March 1961) "Mugearites and Their Place in Alkali Igneous Rock Series". The Journal of Geology Vol. 69, No. 2.
 Richards, Eric (1985) A History of the Highland Clearances. Volume 2: Emigration, protest, reasons. Taylor & Francis.
 OS Landranger 23

Populated places in the Isle of Skye
Geological type localities of Scotland